Cardinal Newman Catholic High School is a coeducational Roman Catholic secondary school. It is graded by Ofsted as a 'Good' school that educates approximately 739 children between 11 and 16 years of age. Ofsted also said that 'Cardinal Newman is a school which has much to be proud of and an exciting future to look forward to. It is a good and improving school.' It is located in the town of Warrington in Cheshire, England. In June 2017, a small fire was found in a ground floor room which caused Firefighters from Warrington and Stockton Heath station to attend.

Notable former pupils 
 James Guy, a 2016 Double Olympic Silver Medalist, World Champion 200 and 4x200 Freestyle European Champion
 Gabriella Leon, an actress who portrayed Jade Lovall in the BBC medical drama series Casualty
 Lewis Owen Heath (credited as Lewis Owen McGibbon), an actor who portrayed Anthony Cunningham in the 2004 Danny Boyle movie Millions.

References

Current OFSTED report

Catholic secondary schools in the Diocese of Shrewsbury
Secondary schools in Warrington
Voluntary aided schools in England